The Liganga mine is a large proposed iron  mine located in Southern highland of  Tanzania in the Ludewa District of Njombe Region. Road construction has begun in 2014. Ongaba represents one of the largest iron ore reserves in Tanzania and (perhaps) in the world having estimated reserves of 1.22 billion tonnes of ore grading 35% iron metal.

References 

Iron mines in Tanzania
Buildings and structures in the Iringa Region